Northumberland East was a federal electoral district represented in the House of Commons of Canada from 1867 to 1917. It was located in the province of Ontario. It was created by the British North America Act of 1867.

The original definition of the riding is not known. In 1882, the East Riding of the county of Northumberland was defined to consist of the townships of Cramahe, Brighton, Murray, Percy and Seymour, the villages of Colborne, Brighton, Campbellford, and Hastings.

The electoral district was abolished in 1914 when it was merged into Northumberland riding.

Electoral history

|- 
  
|Liberal-Conservative
|Joseph Keeler 
|align="right"| 1,607    
 
|Unknown
|Kenneth McKenzie
|align="right"| 827    
 
|Unknown
|Mr. Meyers
|align="right"| 0   
|}

|- 
  
|Liberal-Conservative
|Joseph Keeler 
|align="right"| 1,497    
 
|Independent Liberal
|James Lyons Biggar
|align="right"| 1,430    
|}

|- 
 
|Independent Liberal
|James Lyons Biggar
|align="right"| 1,662    
  
|Liberal-Conservative
|Joseph Keeler 
|align="right"| 1,497    
|}

|- 
 
|Independent Liberal
|James Lyons Biggar
|align="right"| 1,670    
  
|Conservative
|James Cockburn
|align="right"|1,385   
|}

|- 
  
|Liberal-Conservative
|Joseph Keeler 
|align="right"|  1,799    
 
|Independent Liberal
|James Lyons Biggar
|align="right"|1,736    
|}

|- 
 
|Independent Liberal
|Darius Crouter  
|align="right"| acclaimed    
|}

|- 
  
|Conservative
|Edward Cochrane  
|align="right"|2,073    
 
|Independent Liberal
|Darius Crouter  
|align="right"| 1,800    
|}

|- 
  
|Liberal
|Albert Elhanon Mallory 
|align="right"|2,291   
  
|Conservative
|Edward Cochrane  
|align="right"| 2,278    
|}

|- 
  
|Conservative
|COCHRANE, Edward  
|align="right"|  2,148    
  
|Liberal
|MALLORY, Albert E.  
|align="right"| 2,124   
|}

|- 
  
|Conservative
|COCHRANE, Edward  
|align="right"| 2,074    
  
|Liberal
|MALLORY, Albert E.  
|align="right"|2,028   
|}

|- 
  
|Conservative
|COCHRANE, E.  
|align="right"|  2,495    
  
|Liberal
|KETCHUM, M.P.  
|align="right"| 2,259   
|}

|- 
  
|Conservative
|COCHRANE, E.  
|align="right"|  2,410    
 
|Patrons of Industry
|MALLORY, C.A.  
|align="right"| 2,013 
|}

|- 
  
|Conservative
|COCHRANE, Edward  
|align="right"| 2,452    
  
|Liberal
|DENIKE, Robert Baldwin 
|align="right"| 2,086   
|}

|- 
  
|Conservative
|COCHRANE, Edward  
|align="right"|2,402    
  
|Liberal
|DOUGLAS, John H. 
|align="right"|2,196   
|}

|- 
  
|Conservative
|OWEN, C.L.  
|align="right"| 2,347    
  
|Liberal
|MULHOLLAND, A.A. 
|align="right"| 2,105   
|}

|- 
  
|Conservative
|OWEN, Charles Lewis  
|align="right"| 2,448    
  
|Liberal
|WEBB, Frank Leslie 
|align="right"|2,252   
|}

|- 
  
|Conservative
|WALKER, Henry Joseph 
|align="right"| 2,518    
  
|Liberal
|WEATHERSON, Alexander 
|align="right"| 2,127   
|}

See also 

 List of Canadian federal electoral districts
 Past Canadian electoral districts

External links 

 Website of the Parliament of Canada

Former federal electoral districts of Ontario